Sydney Goldstein FRS (3 December 1903, Kingston upon Hull – 22 January 1989, Cambridge, MA) was a British mathematician noted for his contribution to fluid dynamics. He is described as: "... one of those who most influenced progress in fluid dynamics during the 20th century."

Goldstein was extremely knowledgeable on aerodynamics and his work had a significant impact in that area.

Early life
Goldstein was born into the Jewish community of Hull, where his family ran a furniture store. After his mother died he moved to live with an aunt and attended Bede Collegiate School in Sunderland. At the University of Leeds in 1921 he studied mathematics, but was to move to St John's College, Cambridge, graduating from the Mathematical Tripos in 1925 and gaining the Smith's Prize in 1927. He was awarded an Isaac Newton Studentship to continue research in applied mathematics under Harold Jeffreys. His 1928 PhD thesis was entitled The Theory And Application Of Mathieu Functions.

Career
He was appointed Rockefeller Research Fellow and spent a year working in University of Göttingen. In 1929 he became a  fellow of St John's College but later the same year was appointed to a lectureship in Mathematics at the University of Manchester. At Manchester the influence of Osborne Reynolds and Horace Lamb in fluid dynamics was still felt there and had a strong effect on Goldstein. Moving to Cambridge in 1931 he took over the editorship of Modern Developments in Fluid Dynamics on Lamb's death.

During World War II Goldstein worked on boundary layer theory at the National Physical Laboratory and at the end of the war he was appointed to the Beyer Chair of Applied Mathematics in Manchester.

Goldstein strongly supported the State of Israel and in 1950 he accepted the chairmanship of the department of mathematics at Technion – Israel Institute of Technology. Having made a major contribution to the establishment of the Technion, he found the administrative load too heavy and moved again, accepting the chair of  Gordon McKay Professor of Applied Mathematics at Harvard University in 1954. He retired in 1968 but continued as an emeritus professor at Harvard.

Honours
Mayhew Prize, 1925
Smith's Prize, 1927
Adams Prize, 1935
Fellow of the Royal Society, 1937
Worked at the Aerodynamics Division, National Physical Laboratory, 1939–45
Chairman, Aeronautical Research Council, 1946–49
Foreign Member, Royal Netherlands Academy of Sciences and Letters (Section for Sciences), 1950
Plenary Speaker, International Congress of Mathematicians, 1954
Timoshenko Medal, 1965
Foreign Member, Finnish Scientific Society (Section for maths and physics), 1975

Selected publications
 Modern Developments in Fluid Dynamics, 1938. (Editor)
 Lectures on Fluid Mechanics, 1960.

See also
 Taylor–Goldstein equation

External links

References

1903 births
1989 deaths
Fellows of the Royal Society
Mathematicians from Kingston upon Hull
English Jews
Alumni of St John's College, Cambridge
Academics of the Victoria University of Manchester
Harvard University faculty
Fluid dynamicists
People educated at Bede Grammar School for Boys
20th-century  English  mathematicians
Scientists of the National Physical Laboratory (United Kingdom)
British expatriate academics
British expatriates in the United States